The 2005 Trophée Éric Bompard was the fourth event of six in the 2005–06 ISU Grand Prix of Figure Skating, a senior-level international invitational competition series. It was held at the Palais Omnisports Paris Bercy in Paris on November 17–20. Medals were awarded in the disciplines of men's singles, ladies' singles, pair skating, and ice dancing. Skaters earned points toward qualifying for the 2005–06 Grand Prix Final. The compulsory dance was the Ravensburger Waltz.

The competition was named after the Éric Bompard company, which became its chief sponsor in 2004.

Results

Men

Judging panel

Referee: Philippe Meriguet

Technical Controller: Sissy Krick

Technical Specialist: Scott Davis

Assistant Technical Specialist: Pirjo Uimonen

Judge No.1: Gale Tanger 

Judge No.2: William Thompson 

Judge No.3: Igor Dolgushin 

Judge No.4: Irina Medvedeva 

Judge No.5: Francis Betsch 

Judge No.6: Wei Shi 

Judge No.7: Marina Beschea 

Judge No.8: Nikolai Salnikov 

Judge No.9: Rolf Pipoh 

Judge No.10: Markus Germann

Ladies

Pairs

Ice dancing

Judging panel

Referee: Alexandr Gorshkov

Technical Controller: Christine Hurth

Technical Specialist: Andrzej Dostatni

Assistant Technical Specialist: Daniel Hugentobler

Judge No.1: Danuta Dubrowko 

Judge No.2: Simonetta Spalluto 

Judge No.3: Rolf Pipoh 

Judge No.4: Olga Zakova 

Judge No.5: Mieko Fujimori 

Judge No.6: Roland Mäder 

Judge No.7: Richard Dalley 

Judge No.8: Igor Dolgushin 

Judge No.9: Anastassia Makarova 

Judge No.10: Laurent Carriere

External links
 2005 Trophée Éric Bompard

Trophée Éric Bompard, 2005
Internationaux de France
Figure
Trophée Éric Bompard
Trophée Éric Bompard
Figure skating in Paris
International figure skating competitions hosted by France